Mjekić is a settlement in central Kosovo. It is situated west of Obilić.

Notes and references

Notes:

Notes

References:

Villages in Obilić